Pencader may refer to:

Pencader, Carmarthenshire, Wales
Pencader Hundred, an unincorporated subdivision of New Castle County, Delaware, in the United States